Tschida (/ˈtʃiːdə/ CHEE-də) is the surname of the following people:
Brad Tschida (born c. 1954), American politician
Fred Tschida (born 1949), American neon artist
Michael Tschida, American military officer 
Lake Tschida, created by Heart Butte Dam in southwestern North Dakota, U.S., and named after Michael Tschida
Tim Tschida (born 1960), Major League Baseball umpire